Parietaria debilis, commonly known as pellitory, small-flower pellitory, or native pellitory, is a herb native to Australia and New Zealand.

Description
It grows as an annual herb from 7 to 40 centimetres in height, with green or white flowers. Individual plants bear both perfect and imperfect flowers.

Taxonomy
This species was published in 1786 by Georg Forster, based on a type specimen collected in New Zealand. It has twice been moved to other genera—to Urtica by Stephan Endlicher in 1833, and to Freirea by Alexander Viktorovich Jarmolenko in 1941—but neither move was accepted.

Distribution and habitat
It is native to Australia and New Zealand. In Australia it is widespread in temperate regions, occurring in every state and territory. It favours well-drained sites, especially in calcareous soils.

References

External links

debilis
Rosales of Australia
Rosids of Western Australia
Flora of South Australia
Flora of the Northern Territory
Flora of Tasmania
Flora of Victoria (Australia)
Flora of New South Wales
Flora of Queensland
Flora of New Zealand
Flora of Korea